The clown triggerfish (Balistoides conspicillum), also known as the bigspotted triggerfish, is a demersal marine fish belonging to the family Balistidae, or commonly called triggerfish.

Description

The clown triggerfish is a fish which grows up to 50 cm (19.7 inches). Its body has a stocky appearance, oval shape and compressed laterally. The head is large and represents approximately one third of the body length. The mouth is small, terminal and has strong teeth.

The first dorsal fin is composed of three spines, one of which is longer and stronger. It is erectile and hidden in a dorsal furrow.
This set of dorsal spines composed a trigger system which is a characteristic from the family Balistidae.
The second dorsal fin is similar in shape and size to the anal fin which is symmetrically opposed to it.
The pelvic fin is reduced to a ventral protrusion.

The background coloration is black. Half of inferior part of the body is marked with big white spots which are more or less round.
The area around the first dorsal fin is crossed by yellowish sinuosities which draw like a network reminding the leopard's patterns.
There is a yellowish ring around the mouth, which is surrounded by another fin white ring.
A white stripe ride the snout just under the eyes level.
The second dorsal fin and the anal fin are white and underlined with a yellow line at their base.
The caudal peduncle has a yellowish blotch on its top part and has three horizontal sets of spiny scales.
The caudal fin is yellowish in its center and has black margin.
Juveniles have a black background coloration spangled with small white spots, the extremity of the snout and the base of the first dorsal fin is yellowish.

Distribution and habitat
The clown triggerfish is widely distributed throughout the tropical and subtropical waters of the Indian Ocean and in the western Pacific Ocean. A single record was reported in the Mediterranean Sea in spanish waters in 2012, a likely aquarium release. 
It is most commonly found along external reef slopes with clear water until 75 m depth.
Juveniles are usually staying below 20 m sheltered close to caves or overhangs.

Feeding
Balistoides conspicillum has a varied diet based on different benthic organisms like molluscs, echinoderms and crustaceans.

Behaviour
This triggerfish has a diurnal activity, is solitary and defends a territory. It can be very aggressive with other fish and congeners. The first long dorsal spine when is erected, it is used to impress an opponent or to avoid a predator to pull it out of its refuge.

In aquariums
Because of its attractive coloration, this fish is one of the most highly prized aquarium fish. Like many other triggerfish, it can require a large aquarium and be aggressive towards other fish. It should not be kept with small fish. It will also prey on invertebrates in the aquarium. This fish can become tame enough to be hand-fed; however, one should beware of the fish's sharp teeth.

References

 ITIS - Report: Balistoides conspicillum, Retrieved [mai, 30, 2013], from the Integrated Taxonomic Information System on-line database, Integrated Taxonomic Information System.
 Bailly, N. (2013). Balistoides conspicillum (Bloch & Schneider, 1801). In: Froese, R. and D. Pauly. Editors. (2013) FishBase. Accessed through: World Register of Marine Species at WoRMS - World Register of Marine Species - Balistoides conspicillum (Bloch & Schneider, 1801) on 2013-05-30

External links
 

Balistidae
Fish of Palau
Fish of Thailand
Fish described in 1801